Aremonia is a genus of plants belonging to the rose family Rosaceae.

Botanical description

Taxonomy 

 Synonyms
 Agrimonoides P. Miller: Gard.Dict.Abr.ed.4. 1754 
 Spallanzania Pollini: Hort.Prov.Veron.Pl.Nov.10. 1816.

 Aremonia spp.
 Aremonia agrimonoides (bastard-agrimony) 
 Aremonia pouzarii

See also 
 Agrimonia (the true agrimony genus)

Agrimoniinae
Rosaceae genera
Taxa named by Noël Martin Joseph de Necker